Voluntary Marine Conservation Area (VMCA) is a designation in the United Kingdom for areas of coastline which are of particular wildlife and scientific value that enjoy a level of voluntary protection.

VMCAs are run by a range of organisations and steering groups and are often supported by community or volunteer groups. VMCA's often aim to promote the Seashore Code as a means for the public to treat the coastline with care.

The first VMCA to be set up was in Lundy, 1973.

List of VMCA's
Helford - designated in 1987 
North Devon - established in 1994 and spans the coast from Combe Martin to Croyde. Is managed by Devon Wildlife Trust
Purbeck - The first VMCA
Wembury -  Wembury Marine Centre

References

Organisations based in Dorset